The Tata LPTA is a military truck family developed and produced by Indian automobile manufacturer Tata Motors. The trucks are available in 4×4,6×6,8×8,10×10 and 12×12 configurations. With extreme off-road capabilities, they are proposed as replacement for Czech-designed Tatra trucks currently used by Indian armed forces.

History
The Indian Army is one of the biggest users of Tatra trucks in the world with over 10,000 trucks of various types in service. Because of their high-operational flexibility and functional adaptability they formed the backbone of army's tactical & mobilisation capability. These trucks were license-produced in India by BEML, a public sector company. Following the Tatra bribery scam, a ban was imposed on Tatra and the supply of these trucks stopped. Thus, the development of multi axle tactical trucks was started by Tata to meet Army's requirements.

Design
The vehicles have cab over engine modular design. The cab can hold two crew and four passengers. There are 2 roof hatches for firing, observation and emergency exit. The trucks are equipped with a hydraulic crane for loading/unloading equipments. They also come with Central tire inflation system which inflates/deflates tyres according to terrain requirements. For driver's comfort, cab is equipped with HVAC. There is a self recovery winch in the front as well.

The 6×6 and 8×8 variants are powered by a Cummins ISLe engine developing 375 horsepower while the 12×12 variant comes with a Cummins ISXe engine with a maximum of 525 horsepower. 4×4, 6×6, 8×8 variants are mated to a 10 speed (9F+1R) manual transmission while the 12×12 variant comes with an automatic transmission.

Production
In July 2015, Tata won a contract for supplying 1,239 trucks of 6×6 variant to the Indian Army. In March 2016, an additional order for 619 more trucks was placed. The total order was worth 1300 crores making it the biggest order to a local private supplier.

The 8×8 variant has been selected to be the platform for SPYDER Short Range Surface to Air Missiles. Tata has also proposed the 12×12 variant for Nirbhay missile Transporter erector launcher and 8×8 for Pinaka MBRL.

Around 15,000 trucks of 4×4 variant are also in service with Indian Army, all manufactured by the Vehicle Factory Jabalpur (VFJ).

Specifications

References 

LPTA
Vehicles introduced in 2015
Military vehicles introduced in the 2010s
Military trucks of India